GRB 190114C was an extreme gamma-ray burst explosion from a galaxy 4.5 billion light years away 
(z=0.4245; magnitude=15.60est) near the Fornax constellation, that was initially detected in January 2019. The afterglow light emitted soon after the burst was found to be tera-electron volt radiation from inverse Compton emission, identified for the first time. According to the astronomers, "We observed a huge range of frequencies in the electromagnetic radiation afterglow of GRB 190114C. It is the most extensive to date for a gamma-ray burst." Also, according to other astronomers, "light detected from the object had the highest energy ever observed for a GRB: 1 Tera electron volt (TeV) -- about one trillion times as much energy per photon as visible light"; another source stated, "the brightest light ever seen from Earth [to date] ... [the] biggest explosion in the Universe since the Big Bang".

Significance 
Recent publications following the event indicate that inverse Compton scattering is the mechanism responsible for producing TeV photons. X-ray photons are scattered off of the GRB's polar jets of electrons, which move at 0.9999c. In a scattering event, much of the energy of a relativistic electron is transferred to a photon. Researchers "have been trying to observe such very high energy emission from GRB's for a long time, so this detection is considered a milestone in high-energy astrophysics".
The most recent studies propose, in summary, a model of binary system of hypernova (BdHN I) with two neutron stars, where one of them collapses in a black hole, surrounded by an accretion disk and from whose poles the GRB is launched.

See also
 List of gamma-ray bursts
 GRB 020813
 GRB 080916C
 GRB 130427A

References

Further reading

External links 
 
 
 "GRB 190114C" – Hubble Space Telescope
 "GRB 190114C" – University of Chicago/tevcat

 

20191119
Articles containing video clips
January 2019 events
190114C